Catarrhactes meaning "waterfalls" may refer to:
Düden River
Maeander River